Aeletes is a genus of clown beetles in the family Histeridae. There are more than 80 described species in Aeletes.

Species
These 87 species belong to the genus Aeletes:

 Aeletes aciculatus Wenzel, 1944
 Aeletes aldridgei Yélamos, 1998
 Aeletes angustisternus (Scott, 1908)
 Aeletes angustus (Scott, 1908)
 Aeletes assimilis Wenzel, 1944
 Aeletes atomarius (Aubé, 1842)
 Aeletes basalis (J.L.LeConte, 1851)
 Aeletes blackburni Yélamos, 1998
 Aeletes brevisternus (Marseul, 1856)
 Aeletes clarulus (Reitter, 1884)
 Aeletes concentricus Blackburn & Sharp, 1885
 Aeletes confusus (Blackburn, 1885)
 Aeletes crenatus Wenzel, 1944
 Aeletes ctenomyphilus (Bickhardt, 1920)
 Aeletes daubani (Scott, 1913)
 Aeletes davidsoni (Scott, 1913)
 Aeletes dybasi Wenzel, 1944
 Aeletes espanoli Yélamos, 1998
 Aeletes eutretus (Scott, 1908)
 Aeletes facilis Blackburn & Sharp, 1885
 Aeletes flavitarsis Lewis, 1879
 Aeletes floridae (Marseul, 1862)
 Aeletes fordi Yélamos, 1998
 Aeletes franzi Gomy, 1984
 Aeletes fryeri (Scott, 1913)
 Aeletes fuscus Yélamos, 1998
 Aeletes gemmula (Wollaston, 1865)
 Aeletes germanus (Scott, 1908)
 Aeletes gulliver (Marseul, 1856)
 Aeletes haleakalae (Scott, 1908)
 Aeletes hawaiiensis (Scott, 1908)
 Aeletes insignis Casey, 1916
 Aeletes insolitus (Scott, 1908)
 Aeletes jamaicus Gomy, 1981
 Aeletes kaalae Yélamos, 1998
 Aeletes kauaiensis (Scott, 1908)
 Aeletes kilaueae Yélamos, 1998
 Aeletes kukuiae (Scott, 1908)
 Aeletes laevis (Scott, 1908)
 Aeletes laeviusculus (Marseul, 1856)
 Aeletes lanaiensis (Scott, 1908)
 Aeletes leai Gomy, 1983
 Aeletes lewisi Yélamos, 1998
 Aeletes lissosternus Wenzel, 1944
 Aeletes longipes Blackburn & Sharp, 1885
 Aeletes makaweliae (Scott, 1908)
 Aeletes mauiae (Scott, 1908)
 Aeletes minor (Scott, 1908)
 Aeletes mohihiensis Yélamos, 1998
 Aeletes molokaiae (Scott, 1908)
 Aeletes monticola Blackburn & Sharp, 1885
 Aeletes neckerensis Yélamos, 1998
 Aeletes negrei Yélamos, 1998
 Aeletes nepos (Scott, 1908)
 Aeletes oahuensis Yélamos, 1998
 Aeletes orioli Yélamos, 1998
 Aeletes ornatus (Scott, 1908)
 Aeletes oromii Yélamos, 1995
 Aeletes parvulus (Scott, 1908)
 Aeletes perkinsi (Scott, 1908)
 Aeletes poeyi (Marseul, 1862)
 Aeletes politus (J. L. LeConte, 1853)
 Aeletes pulchellus (Scott, 1908)
 Aeletes punctatus (Scott, 1908)
 Aeletes rectistrius Wenzel, 1944
 Aeletes romiae Yélamos, 1998
 Aeletes rugiceps Wenzel, 1944
 Aeletes rugipygus Wenzel, 1944
 Aeletes samuelsoni Yélamos, 1998
 Aeletes schwarzi Wenzel, 1944
 Aeletes scotti Yélamos, 1998
 Aeletes sculptus (Scott, 1908)
 Aeletes sharpi Yélamos, 1998
 Aeletes similis (Scott, 1908)
 Aeletes simplex (J. E. LeConte, 1844)
 Aeletes simpliculus (Marseul, 1856)
 Aeletes solitarius (Scott, 1908)
 Aeletes subalatus (Scott, 1908)
 Aeletes subbasalis (Scott, 1908)
 Aeletes subniger Wenzel, 1944
 Aeletes subrotundus (Scott, 1908)
 Aeletes sulcipennis Wenzel, 1944
 Aeletes swezeyi Yélamos, 1998
 Aeletes termitophilus Wenzel, 1944
 Aeletes troglodytes Wenzel, 1944
 Aeletes waianaae (Scott, 1908)
 Aeletes zimmermani Yélamos, 1998

References

Further reading

External links

 

Histeridae
Articles created by Qbugbot